Seminars in Ophthalmology is a peer-reviewed medical journal which publishes clinically oriented reviews on the diagnosis and treatment of ophthalmic disorders. Each issue focuses on a single topic, with a primary emphasis on appropriate surgical techniques.

Editor 
The editor in chief of Seminars in Ophthalmology is Prof.Mohammad Javed Ali, of the L.V. Prasad Eye Institute.

References 

Ophthalmology journals
Taylor & Francis academic journals
Publications established in 1986